Alexander Hamilton is a 1792 full-length portrait of Alexander Hamilton by John Trumbull. It is one of multiple paintings John Trumbull made of Alexander Hamilton.

In 2013, the painting was donated by Credit Suisse to both New York's Metropolitan Museum of Art and the Crystal Bridges Museum of American Art in Bentonville, Arkansas. According to The Met, the work is considered the "greatest known portrait of Hamilton and one of the finest civic portraits from the Federal period".

References

External links
 

1792 paintings
Paintings by John Trumbull
Cultural depictions of Alexander Hamilton
Paintings in the collection of the Metropolitan Museum of Art
Collection of the Crystal Bridges Museum of American Art
18th-century portraits
Portraits of men
Portraits of politicians